Nathaniel Taylor (March 31, 1938 – February 27, 2019) was an American television and film actor best known for portraying Rollo Lawson on the 1970s sitcoms Sanford and Son, Grady and the 1980s sitcom Sanford.

He acted in several movies and TV shows and later created a performing arts studio. Some of the major shows where he acted are The Redd Foxx Show, Police Story and What's Happening!! . Taylor was in the films Trouble Man (1972) and Willie Dynamite (1974).

Early life
Taylor was born on March 31, 1938, in St. Louis, Missouri. Growing up, he had two brothers (Richard and Eugene) and three sisters (Betty, Mary, and Rose).

Career
Before becoming an actor, Taylor was working as an electrician at the Performing Arts Society of Los Angeles (PASLA). His mentor, Larry Clark, suggested he try out for a part. Clark had him read a few lines to him and then sent him down to Redd Foxx's room. They had talked about their hometown, St. Louis. Foxx told Taylor that he had the role which would become Rollo Lawson.

Taylor was best known for his recurring role as Rollo Lawson in the 1970s sitcom Sanford and Son, a role he later reprised on its short-lived 1980–1981 spin-off Sanford. He later played the first version of Jim-Jam with Redd Foxx on the 1986 series The Redd Foxx Show. In the late 1970s, he played Rerun's (Fred Berry) brother–in–law, Ike, in the sitcom What's Happening!!. Taylor also reprised the role of Rollo Lawson in the short–lived Grady. He was also guest starred in episodes of The Bill Cosby Show, Adam 12, and Police Story.

Taylor also was featured in Trouble Man starring Robert Hooks as one of Mr. Big's henchmen. The film featured a soundtrack by Marvin Gaye. In 1973, he was in Clark's As Above, So Below. Taylor later became the Executive Director of Performing Arts Society of Los Angeles (PASLA). He was in the blaxploitation film Willie Dynamite. Taylor also starred in The Hunter. In 2016, he was in the short film Auditioning for Nathaniel directed by Kevin Jerome Everson as himself.

BlueLine Classics, LLC bought the original 1951 Ford F1 used in Sanford and Son. The owners, Jeff Canter and Tim Franko, loved the idea of restoring the Ford. After it was restored, in October 2015, they decided to reunite a cast member with the truck they preserved. Canter searched for Taylor on Facebook and could not find him. He did, however, find him the old-fashioned way and contacted him. Taylor called Canter and agreed to sign autographs with the restored Ford truck in October 2015. In June 2016, Taylor was asked to sign autographs at the Hard Rock Rocksino Northfield Park with the 1951 Ford F1 'Sanford and Son Salvage' truck. He remembers in the season 4 episode, "Fred's Treasure Garden", where his character had marijuana referring to the "wild parsley" scene, which a lot of fans reminisce about.

Personal life and death
Taylor was friends with fellow actor Rocco Karega and Hip-Hop promoter Alonzo Williams. and producer Darius Owens of North Carolina  He was married to Loretta until his death. Together, Taylor and Loretta had two children. Taylor had five children from a previous marriage to Bernice Gordon-Taylor  After Taylor stopped acting, he opened a performing arts studio for young actors.

In April 1986, the Los Angeles Police Department arrested and booked Taylor on burglary charges along with his brother, James, and Pang Shing. About $200,000.00 in computers and typewriters were seized. The arrest came within hours of the Sports Connection athletic club in West Los Angeles reported the theft of 10 IBM typewriters and a computer, police Lt. Howard Hughie said.

On February 23, 2019, Taylor was rushed to Ronald Reagan UCLA Medical Center after suffering from a heart attack. He died there from the complications of it on February 27, 2019.

Filmography

Film

Television

Documentaries

References

Citations

Sources

External links

Nathaniel Taylor at Find a Grave

1938 births
2019 deaths
African-American male actors
American male television actors
Male actors from St. Louis
20th-century African-American people
21st-century African-American people